The Booch method is a method for object-oriented software development.  It is composed of an object modeling language, an iterative object-oriented development process, and a set of recommended practices.

The method was authored by Grady Booch when he was working for Rational Software (acquired by IBM), published in 1992 and revised in 1994.  It was widely used in software engineering for object-oriented analysis and design and benefited from ample documentation and support tools.

The notation aspect of the Booch method was superseded by the Unified Modeling Language (UML), which features graphical elements from the Booch method along with elements from the object-modeling technique (OMT) and object-oriented software engineering (OOSE).  Methodological aspects of the Booch method have been incorporated into several methodologies and processes, the primary such methodology being the Rational Unified Process (RUP).

Content of the method

The Booch notation is characterized by cloud shapes to represent classes and distinguishes the following diagrams:

 
The process is organized around a macro and a micro process.

The macro process identifies the following activities cycle: 
 Conceptualization : establish core requirements
 Analysis : develop a model of the desired behavior
 Design : create an architecture 
 Evolution: for the implementation
 Maintenance : for evolution after the delivery

The micro process is applied to new classes, structures or behaviors that emerge during the macro process.  It is made of the following cycle: 
 Identification of classes and objects
 Identification of their semantics 
 Identification of their relationships
 Specification of their interfaces and implementation

References

External links
Class diagrams, Object diagrams, State Event diagrams and Module diagrams.
 The Booch Method of Object-Oriented Analysis & Design

Software design
Object-oriented programming
Programming principles

de:Grady Booch#Booch-Notation